Padim da Graça is a Portuguese parish, located in the municipality of Braga. The population in 2011 was 1,521, in an area of 3.39 km².

References

Freguesias of Braga